Néstor Fabián Pitana (born 17 June 1975) is an Argentine former football referee and former actor who refereed at the 2014 FIFA World Cup, 2015 Copa América and 2018 FIFA World Cup. He oversaw the opening match of the 2018 FIFA World Cup between Russia and Saudi Arabia. Pitana was appointed to take charge of the 2018 FIFA World Cup Final between France and Croatia at Moscow on 15 July 2018. He became the second referee to take charge of the opening game and the Final in the same tournament (after fellow Argentinian Horacio Elizondo, who did the same in 2006).

FIFA World Cup

2018 World Cup final 

Pitana's performance in the 2018 FIFA World Cup Final has seen some controversy, mostly related to the use of Video Assistant Referee (VAR) technology. France's first goal was scored from a free kick that was seen by many as a dive from Antoine Griezmann (the rules at the time related to VAR forbade intervention in the case, however). France's second goal was scored from a penalty given after Pitana was informed by VAR that he may wish to review the recording of Ivan Perišić's handball. After a lengthy deliberation, Pitana awarded the penalty to France, which many pundits called an incorrect interpretation of the rules.

Record

Statistics 
{| class="wikitable sortable sortbottom" style="font-size:100%; text-align: center; width: 85%;"
!align=left|Tournaments
!Constester
!Years
!Matches
!
! Average
!
! Average
|- 
|align=left| Primera División de Argentina
| AFA–SAF
|2007–
|269
|1275
|4.74
|89
|0.33
|- 
|align=left| Primera B Nacional
| AFA
| 2006–2017
| 61
| 278
| 4.55
| 14
| 0.23
|- 
|align=left| Copa Argentina
| AFA
| 2011–
| 4
| 19
| 4.75
| 1
| 0.25
|- 
|align=left| Supercopa Argentina
| AFA
| 2014
| 1
| 4
| 4.00
| 0
| 0.00
|- 
|align=left| Relegation
| AFA
| 2009–2012
| 4
| 27
| 6.75
| 0
|0.00
|- 
|align=left| Copa América
| Conmebol
| 2015
| 2
| 8
| 4.00
| 1
| 0.50
|- 
|align=left| Copa Conmebol Libertadores
| Conmebol
| 2010–
| 34
| 158
| 4.64
| 7
| 0.21
|- 
|align=left| Copa Conmebol Sudamericana
| Conmebol
| 2010–
| 16
| 79
| 4.94
| 7
| 0.44
|- 
|align=left| Recopa Conmebol Sudamericana
| Conmebol
| 2012; 2015
| 2 
| 11
| 5.50
| 2
| 1.00
|- 
|align=left| South American Under-17 Football Championship
| Conmebol
| 2011
| 3
| 11
| 3.67
| 0
|0.00
|- 
|align=left|FIFA World Cup
|FIFA
| 2014; 2018
| 9
| 23
| 2.56
| 0
|0.00
|- 
|align=left|FIFA Confederations Cup
|FIFA
| 2017
| 2
| 5
| 2.50
| 0
|0.00
|- 
|align=left|FIFA World Cup qualification CONMEBOL
|FIFA
| 2011–
| 10
| 52
| 5.20
| 3
| 0.33
|- 
|align=left|FIFA World Cup Intercontinental play-offs
|FIFA
| 2017
| 1
| 7
| 7.00
| 0
| 0.00
|- 
|align=left|Friendlies
|FIFA
| 2011–2012
| 2
| 11
| 5.50
| 0
| 0.00
|- 
|align=left|2016 Río de Janeiro
|IOC–FIFA
| 2016
| 2
| 5
| 2.50
| 0
| 0.00
|- 
!! align=left colspan=2|Totals || 2006– || 422 || 1973 || 4.67 || 124 || 0.29
|- 
!! align=left colspan=8|Matches as referee are correct as of 13 August 2018
|}Source: worldfootball.net''

References

External links

 Néstor Pitana

1975 births
Living people
Argentine football referees
2014 FIFA World Cup referees
Argentine male actors
Copa América referees
2018 FIFA World Cup referees
FIFA World Cup Final match officials
Football referees at the 2016 Summer Olympics